Peter Pinkerton FRSE (1870–1930) was an early 20th century Scottish mathematician who served as Rector of Glasgow High School.

Life
He was born on 8 June 1870 in Kilmarnock, the sixth son of John Pinkerton (born 1830) an Irish-born boiler-maker, and his wife, Mary Harvey (born 1835) from Orkney. He was educated at Kilmarnock Academy
then studied Mathematics at Glasgow University graduating MA in 1890.

In 1893 he became Mathematics Master at Allan Glen's School in Glasgow. In 1899 he moved to Belfast then in 1903 returned to Scotland to teach at George Watson's College in Edinburgh.

In 1905 he was elected a Fellow of the Royal Society of Edinburgh. His proposers were William Thomson, Lord Kelvin, William Jack, Andrew Gray and George Alexander Gibson. At this time he lived at 36 Morningside Grove in southwest Edinburgh.

Glasgow University awarded him two honorary doctorates: DSc in 1909 and LLD in 1930.

From 1914 until death he was Rector of Glasgow High School.

He died in Glasgow on 21 November 1930.

Family

His wife died early in life but they had one son, Dr Herbert Harvey Pinkerton (1901–1982) a physician and noted amateur golfer.

Publications
Elements of Analytical Geometry (1911)

References

1870 births
1930 deaths
People from Kilmarnock
Alumni of the University of Glasgow
Scottish mathematicians
Fellows of the Royal Society of Edinburgh